The 1932–33 Montreal Maroons season was the 9th season for the National Hockey League franchise.

Offseason
Former coach Eddie Gerard as both General Manager and Coach of the team.

Regular season

Final standings

Record vs. opponents

Game log

Playoffs
They went against Detroit and lost 5 goals to 2, or 2–5.

Player stats

Regular season
Scoring

Goaltending

Playoffs
Scoring

Goaltending

Note: GP = Games played; G = Goals; A = Assists; Pts = Points; +/- = Plus/minus; PIM = Penalty minutes; PPG = Power-play goals; SHG = Short-handed goals; GWG = Game-winning goals
      MIN=Minutes played; W = Wins; L = Losses; T = Ties; GA = Goals against; GAA = Goals against average; SO = Shutouts;

Awards and records

Transactions

See also
1932–33 NHL season

References

Montreal Maroons seasons
Montreal Maroons
Montreal Maroons